Shu-Sin, also Šu-Suen (: DŠuDSîn, after the Moon God Sîn", the "𒀭" being a silent honorific for "Divine", formerly read Gimil-Sin) was king of Sumer and Akkad, and was the penultimate king of the Ur III dynasty. He succeeded his father Amar-Sin, and reigned c. 1973–1964 BC (short chronology).

Reign
Following an open revolt of his Amorite subjects, he directed the construction of a fortified wall between the Euphrates and the Tigris rivers in his fourth year, intending it to hold off any further Amorite attacks. He was succeeded by his son Ibbi-Sin.

An erotic poem addressed to Shu-Sin by a female speaker is preserved in a cuneiform tablet. The poem's speaker expresses her strong desires and longings for the king.

Year names of Shu-sin
The year names for the reign of Shu-sin are all known and give an information about the events of his reign. The most important ones are:
1 Year Szu-Sin became king
2 Year Szu-Sin the king of Ur made / caulked the boat of Enki (called the) 'ibex of the abzu'
3 Year Szu-Sin the king of Ur destroyed Simanum	
4 Year Szu-Sin the king of Ur built the amurru wall (called) 'muriq-tidnim / holding back the Tidanum'
6 Year Szu-Sin the king of Ur erected a magnificent stele for Enlil and Ninlil
7 Year Szu-Sin, the king of Ur, king of the four quarters, destroyed the land of Zabszali
9 Year Szu-Sin the king of Ur built the temple of Szara in Umma

Artifacts
There is vast number of artifacts with inscriptions in the name of Shu-sin.

See also

A Love Song of Shu-Sin (B)
History of Sumer
Sumerian king list

References

Nicole Brisch, The Priestess and the King: The Divine Kingship of Šū-Sîn of Ur,  Journal of the American Oriental Society, vol. 126, no. 2, pp. 161–176, (Apr. - Jun., 2006)

External links

Shu-Sin year names at cdli

|-

Sumerian kings
20th-century BC Sumerian kings
Third Dynasty of Ur